Bingle may refer to:

Surname
Don Bingle (born 1954), American attorney and author
Hanne Bingle (born 1958), Danish women's rights activist, London Underground driver, and powerlifter
Hendrik Johannes Jacob Bingle (1910-2007), South African academic
Lara Worthington (née Bingle, born 1987), Australian model
Linda M. Bingle, game designer
Mr. Bingle, fictional snowman assistant to Santa Claus
Walter Bingle (1861-1928), Australian public servant

Other
Bing Crosby (1903-1977), nicknamed Der Bingle in Germany
Bingle, slang term for a car accident
Bingle Bangle, play by South Korean group AOA
Bingle Insurance, Australian insurance company and part of Suncorp Group
Bingles, Australian sitcom